María Teresa Urbina Gómez (born 20 March 1985, in Zorita) is a Spanish runner competing primarily in the 3000 metres steeplechase. She represented her country at the 2017 World Championships without qualifying for the final. Additionally, she won a silver medal at the 2006 Ibero-American Championships.

International competitions

Personal bests

Outdoor
1500 metres – 4:29.58 (Cáceres 2007)
3000 metres – 9:25.45 (Ciudad Real 2017)
5000 metres – 16:48.42 (Gijón 2005)
10 kilometres – 33:46 (Madrid 2012)
Half marathon – 1:15:26 (Madrid 2017)
2000 metres steeplechase – 6:32.33 (Fuenlabrada 2017)
3000 metres steeplechase – 9:41.95 (Heusden-Zolder 2009)

Indoor
3000 metres – 9:09.50 (Karlsruhe 2013)

References

1985 births
Living people
Spanish female middle-distance runners
Spanish female steeplechase runners
World Athletics Championships athletes for Spain
Sportspeople from the Province of Cáceres
Athletes (track and field) at the 2013 Mediterranean Games
Athletes (track and field) at the 2018 Mediterranean Games
Mediterranean Games competitors for Spain
21st-century Spanish women